John Petre may refer to:

John Petre (died 1571), MP for Dartmouth (UK Parliament constituency)
John Petre (died 1581), MP for Exeter (UK Parliament constituency)
John Petre, 1st Baron Petre (1549–1613)
John Petre, 5th Baron Petre (1629–1684)
John Petre, 18th Baron Petre (born 1942)

See also
John Peter (disambiguation)